Anyphops narcissi is a species of spider in the family Selenopidae. It was first described by Benoit in 1972, and is currently only known from Eswatini (Swaziland).

References 

Selenopidae
Endemic fauna of Eswatini
Spiders of Africa
Spiders described in 1972